The Brinkerhoff House is located in Wood-Ridge, Bergen County, New Jersey, United States. The building was originally constructed in 1792 by George Brinkerhoff. In the 1870s the house was remodeled by Henry E. Brinkerhoff. The house was renovated and turned into the Wood-Ridge Memorial Library in 1954. The house was renovated again and expanded in 2000. The house was added to the National Register of Historic Places on July 24, 1984.

See also 

 National Register of Historic Places listings in Bergen County, New Jersey

References

Houses on the National Register of Historic Places in New Jersey
Houses in Bergen County, New Jersey
National Register of Historic Places in Bergen County, New Jersey
Wood-Ridge, New Jersey
New Jersey Register of Historic Places